Andrei Nicușor Negru (born 24 May 1994) is a Romanian handballer who plays for Dinamo București and the Romania national team.

Achievements
Liga Națională:  
Gold Medalist: 2019, 2020, 2021
Silver Medalist: 2015, 2016, 2017
Cupa României:
Winner: 2016

Individual awards 
 IHF Youth World Championship Top Scorer: 2013
 IHF Junior World Championship Top Scorer: 2015
 Prosport All-Star Left Wing of the Romanian Liga Națională: 2017

References
 

1994 births
Living people
Sportspeople from Reșița
Romanian male handball players